František Erben (27 November 1874 – 9 June 1942) was a gymnast, trainer, and educator from Bohemia, in what is now the Czech Republic. Erben made his international competitive debut at the 1900 Paris Summer Olympics where he finished in 32nd place.

He took part in the third-ever World Championships in 1907, where the Bohemian team made its auspicious debut and started their several-decades-long tradition of great success at World and Olympic competition in the sport of artistic gymnastics.  He took bronze in the overall competition, behind his compatriot Josef Čada and Frenchman Jules Rolland. Bohemia also took gold in the team competition, and Erben took gold in both the horizontal bar and pommel horse and bronze in the parallel bars.  At the next World Championships, in 1909, the Bohemian team won silver, behind France.  At the next World Championships, Erben won silver on the horizontal bar and bronze on the rings.

In addition to his competitive sporting career, Erben was also a very respected and highly sought-after instructor.  Against other competing applicants from other countries and systems, such as Germany and Sweden, Erben was chosen by the Russian Government to be a gymnastics teacher at their military academies and "in 1909...was designated teacher of gymnastics at the military academy in Petrograd...Russia.".  Previously, Česká Obec Sokolská, or COS (Czech Sokol Organization) hired him as a traveling instructor for their organization.  During World War I, he joined the Czechoslovak Legion and returned to Czechoslovakia after the war.  In May 1925, Erben, described as a "teacher [who] had no equal" was hired as the Director of Sokol instructor schools, concurrent with the opening of Palác Michny z Vacínova (Michna Palace from Vacínov), more currently and simply known as Tyršův dům (Tyrš House).

Despite having suffered several strokes later in life, and being 67 years old, Erben, an active member of Sokol organization was executed by Nazi Germans at the Kobylisy shooting range in Prague, following the assassination of Reinhard Heydrich by the members of Czech resistance.

References

External links

 
 
 Historic Gymnastics World Championship Winners

Czech male artistic gymnasts
Olympic gymnasts of Bohemia
Gymnasts at the 1900 Summer Olympics
Gymnasts from Prague
1874 births
1942 deaths
People executed at Kobylisy shooting range
Czechoslovak civilians killed in World War II
Czechoslovak Legion personnel
Sportspeople from the Austro-Hungarian Empire